Earth, Planets and Space is a peer-reviewed open access scientific journal published by Springer Science+Business Media and Terra Scientific Publishing Company on behalf of five Japanese learned societies: 
 Seismological Society of Japan, 
 Society of Geomagnetism and Earth, Planetary and Space Sciences, 
 Volcanological Society of Japan, 
 Geodetic Society of Japan, and
 Japanese Society for Planetary Sciences. 
It was established in 1949 as the Journal of Geomagnetism and Geoelectricity and obtained its current name in 1998 when it absorbed the Journal of Physics of the Earth (established 1952). The editor-in-chief is Takeshi Sagiya (Nagoya University).

Abstracting and indexing 
The journal is abstracted and indexed in:

References

External links 
 

Springer Science+Business Media academic journals
Publications established in 1949
Geophysics journals
Open access journals
Publications established in 1952
Earth and atmospheric sciences journals
Planetary science journals
Space science journals
Academic journals associated with learned and professional societies of Japan